The Manic Monologues is a play developed and premiered by Zachary Burton and Elisa Hofmeister at Stanford University. The play consists of autobiographical accounts of mental illness from people diagnosed with mental health disorders, the family and friends of mental health patients, and health professionals. The play explores diagnoses including bipolar, schizophrenia, depression, OCD, and PTSD in stories that are by turns tragic, humorous, and uplifting.

The play aims to break down the social stigma surrounding mental illness, with The Washington Post calling it "A play that hopes to smash the stigma surrounding mental illness."

Background 
Burton and Hofmeister wrote the play in the wake of Burton's 2017 bipolar diagnosis while a doctoral student at Stanford University, drawing inspiration from The Vagina Monologues and incorporating approximately 20 true stories of mental illness provided by individuals across the U.S., Canada, and beyond. Psychiatrist Rona Hu (who served as advisor to the first season of Netflix's 13 Reasons Why), psychologist and professor Stephen P. Hinshaw, advocate and performer Victoria Maxwell, playwright and Pulitzer Prize finalist Amy Freed, editor Tom Shroder, physician and Emmy awardee Seema Yasmin, and activist Kenidra Woods consulted on the writing and production of the play.

The Manic Monologues premiered during Mental Health Awareness Month in 2019 at Stanford University. The play has shown in Des Moines, Iowa, where David Felton of BroadwayWorld dubbed it "A production I won't soon forget," and at the University of California, Los Angeles. The script is currently offered to theaters and groups wishing to produce the play themselves.

References

External links 
  Official website

2019 plays
Monologues
Plays and musicals about disability
Works about depression
Bipolar disorder
Schizophrenia
Obsessive–compulsive disorder in non-fiction literature
Advocacy groups